The Ambassador of Russia to Egypt is the official representative of the President and the Government of the Russian Federation to the President and the Government of Egypt.

There are consulates-general in Alexandria and Hurghada, as well as a trade mission and cultural centre based in Cairo, and a second cultural centre in Alexandria. The ambassador to Egypt is concurrently appointed as the Russian representative to the Arab League.

The current incumbent Russian Ambassador to Egypt is Georgy Borisenko, incumbent since 27 April 2020.

History of diplomatic relations

Relations were maintained after the establishment of the Khedivate of Egypt 1867, though they were temporarily broken off on 12 April 1877 during the Russo-Turkish War. They were resumed on 1 August 1878, under the previous representative, . Relations were raised to the level of envoy on 5 August 1911, during  period as representative. Smirnov continued to represent Russia after the fall of the Russian monarchy in the February Revolution in 1917, representing the new Russian Provisional Government. When this was overthrown by the Bolsheviks in the October Revolution later that year, Smirnov refused to recognise the new regime, and was dismissed from his post by the People's Commissar for Foreign Affairs on 9 December 1917. This marked a break in official relations between Egypt, which had been established as a British protectorate in 1914 as the Sultanate of Egypt, and the new Soviet state. Smirnov nevertheless continued to operate as envoy on behalf of Russian interests until 6 October 1923 when the newly nominally independent Kingdom of Egypt ceased to recognise the former imperial representatives.

Sporadic efforts by the Soviet Union to re-establish relations with Egypt continued over the next two decades, at first led by People's Commissar for Foreign Affairs Georgy Chicherin and Vatslav Vorovsky, the Soviet representative to Italy, and Vorovsky's successor . The Egyptian government remained suspicious of the Egyptian communist movement and its connections to Comintern, and little was achieved. In 1926 a fall in the world price of cotton led to economic crisis in Egypt, and in 1927 talks between Soviet and Egyptian representatives took place in Ankara concerning the reestablishment of trade links. This led to the opening of an office of Textilimport in Alexandria in 1928, the first Soviet official mission in Egypt, and one concerned with the purchase of Egyptian cotton. Evidence soon mounted that the mission's employees were also involved in propaganda activities, and the mission was expelled in 1929. However trade links grew during the 1930s, and overtures from figures in the Egyptian government to Soviet diplomatic representatives took place during the Second World War. The Egyptian ambassador in London, met with his Soviet counterpart, Ivan Maisky, and suggested a resumption of diplomatic relations.  After negotiations between the diplomats, an official approach from Egyptian Prime Minister Mostafa El-Nahas was accepted by the Soviet government, and Maisky and El-Nahas met in Alexandria to formalise relations on 26 August 1943. The announcements of the establishment of relations took place in Egypt on 7 September, and in Russia on 9 September.

The first ambassador, appointed on 14 October was Nikolai Novikov. In addition to his duties as representative to Egypt, he was also accredited to the governments-in-exile of Yugoslavia and Greece, who were based in Cairo during the occupation of their countries. Soviet representation continued during the post-war years, and after the Egyptian revolution of 1952, which formed the Arab Republic of Egypt. The status of the official representative was raised from envoy to ambassador in 1954, and continued after the formation of the United Arab Republic between Egypt and Syria on 22 February 1958. The new state had its capital in Cairo, and the former Soviet representative to Egypt, continued as ambassador. A consulate-general was opened in Damascus in 1958, though with the secession of Syria from the Union in 1961, this was upgraded to an embassy with its own representation. Egypt continued to be known as the United Arab Republic until 1971 when it become known once more as the Arab Republic of Egypt. With the dissolution of the Soviet Union in 1991, the Soviet ambassador Vladimir Polyakov instead became the representative of the Russian Federation, and continued in post until 1995.

List of representatives (1784 - present)

Representatives of the Russian Empire to the Egypt Eyalet (1784-1867)

Representatives of the Russian Empire to the Khedivate of Egypt (1867-1914)

Representatives of the Russian Empire to the Sultanate of Egypt (1914-1917)

Representatives of the Russian Provisional Government to the Sultanate of Egypt (1917)

Representatives of the Soviet Union to the Kingdom of Egypt (1943-1953)

Representatives of the Soviet Union to the Arab Republic of Egypt (1953-1958)

Representatives of the Soviet Union to the United Arab Republic (1958-1971)

Representatives of the Soviet Union to the Arab Republic of Egypt (1971-1991)

Representatives of the Russian Federation to the Arab Republic of Egypt (1991-present)

References 

 
 
Egypt
Russia